Cuatro Pantanos Airport is an airport  northwest of the town of Vichuquén in the Maule Region of Chile.

East approaches and departures are over the lake, while west approaches and departures have terrain rising to over  immediately at the west end of the runway.

See also

Transport in Chile
List of airports in Chile

References

External links
OpenStreetMap - Cuatro Pantanos
OurAirports - Cuatro Pantanos Airport
FallingRain - Cuatro Pantanos Airport

Airports in Chile
Airports in Maule Region